The Zimmern List is a 2020 Daytime Emmy-winning travel and cuisine television show hosted by Andrew Zimmern on the Travel Channel in the US.  The first season debuted on Thursday, September 14, 2017. On May 8, 2018, the series was picked up for a second season.

The Zimmern List finds Andrew visiting a different city, serving as the viewers' guide while he recounts personal food memories, shares the culinary history of each location, and shows what to eat and where to find it.

Episodes

Season 1 (2017–18)

Season 2 (2018–2019)

References

External links 
 

2017 American television series debuts
English-language television shows
Food travelogue television series
Travel Channel original programming
Adventure travel